Bäckhammar is a locality situated in Kristinehamn Municipality, Värmland County, Sweden with 284 inhabitants in 2010.

References 

Populated places in Värmland County
Populated places in Kristinehamn Municipality